Carbfix is an academic-industrial partnership that has developed a novel approach (CO2-to-stone) to capturing and storing CO2 by its capture in water and its injection into subsurface basalts.  Once in the subsurface, the injected CO2 reacts with the host rock forming stable carbonate minerals, thus providing for the safe, long-term storage of the captured gas.

Carbfix was initiated jointly by the Icelandic President, Dr Ólafur Ragnar Grímsson, Einar Gunnlaugsson at Reykjavík Energy, Wallace S. Broecker at Columbia University, Eric H. Oelkers at CNRS Toulouse (France), and Sigurður Reynir Gíslason at University of Iceland to limit the Greenhouse gas emissions in Iceland. Reykjavik Energy supplied the initial funding for Carbfix. Further funding has been supplied by The European Commission and the Department of Energy of the United States. In addition to finding a new method for permanent carbon dioxide storage, another objective of the project was to train scientists for years of work to come.

After years of preliminary experimental and field characterisation approximately 200 tons were injected into subsurface basalts in 2012. Research results published in 2016 showed that 95% of the injected CO2 was solidified into calcite within 2 years, using 25 tonnes of water per tonne of CO2. Since this time this successful carbon capture and storage approach has been upscaled at Hellisheiði and ongoing research is implementing this approach at other sites across Europe.

Carbfix Approach

CO2 is captured either by its dissolution in water from power plant exhaust, or directly from the atmosphere by air capture followed by its dissolution in water. The carbonated water is injected into the subsurface where it reacts with the Ca and Mg present in the rock.  Calcium and magnesium are present in rocks - but rarely as oxides where the reactions would be simply:

 CaO +  → CaCO3
 MgO + CO2 → MgCO3

However silicate minerals of these elements are common in many rocks, such as basalt, so an example reaction might be: 
 Mg2SiO4 + 2CO2 → 2MgCO3 + SiO2
as a result CO2 is locked away with no dangerous byproducts.

Practicalities
Drilling and injecting carbonated water at high pressure into basaltic rocks at Hellisheiði has been proven to be very cost effective. Estimates show that this approach captures and stores CO2 and other acid gases as stable mineral phases for less than $25 a ton.

This project commenced carbon injection in 2012.  The funding was supplied by the University of Iceland, Columbia University, France's National Centre of Scientific Research, the United States Department of Energy, the EU, Nordic funds and Reykjavik Energy.

These funding sources include the European Union's Horizon 2020 research and innovation programme under grant agreements No. 764760 and 764810. The European Commission through the projects CarbFix (EC coordinated action 283148), Min-GRO (MC-RTN-35488), Delta-Min (PITN-GA-2008-215360), and -REACT (EC Project 317235).  Nordic fund 11029-NORDICCS; the Icelandic GEORG Geothermal Research fund (09-02-001) to S.R.G. and Reykjavik Energy; and the U.S. Department of Energy under award number DE-FE0004847.

Challenges
This approach requires substantial water and the presence of reactive rocks, which are not available in all localities.

The nearby Hengill volcano, generated a swarm of low magnitude earthquakes as a result of pumping water without the CO2, with 250 quakes being reported on 13 September 2011.

There have been earthquakes reported due to the injection of waste water in the area. Proceedings at the 2010 World Geothermal Congress reported that reinjection at Hellisheiði had induced seismic activity.

Cost
Cost is around US$25 per tonne of CO2.

Current status
Carbfix was updated, as part of the EC funded CarbFix2 project starting in June 2014 at the Hellisheiði geothermal power plant. CarbFix2 was designed to capture all of the hydrogen sulfide and most of the carbon dioxide generated from the power plant.  As of 2018, 68% of the H2S and 34% of the CO2 is being captured as a dissolved phase in water and injected to a depth of 750 metres underground into basaltic rocks. Results show that the majority of these injected gases are fixed as stable mineral phases in less than one year. Further work has focused on the direct capture of CO2 from the atmosphere coupled to its subsurface mineralization.

Carbfix is currently run by a set of three scientific directors: Sigurður Reynir Gíslason of the University of Iceland, Eric H. Oelkers of the CNRS Toulouse, and Edda Sif Aradóttir of Reykjavik Energy. Current efforts are aimed at generalizing the Carbfix process in part through the use of seawater for CO2 capture and storage, so the method can be adopted worldwide.

The Carbfix approach is currently being adopted at four new sites in Europe through the EC funded GECO project.

Reykjavik Energy launched a subsidiary, Carbfix, to commercialize this technology in 2019.

On 20 July 2021 the Swiss and Icelandic governments have agreed to jointly develop “negative emission technologies” which involve extracting CO2 from the atmosphere and storing it underground using Carbfix and Climeworks.

External links
Carbfix.com – Website of the project

, Aug 23, 2016 PBS NewsHour

References

Emissions reduction
Environment of Iceland
Climate engineering